Tennis was part of the 2007 All-Africa Games competition schedule.

Results

Men

Women

References 
Sports123

2007 All-Africa Games
2007
All-Africa Games
Tennis in Algeria